St. Martin's Le Grand is a former liberty within the City of London, and is the name of a street north of Newgate Street and Cheapside and south of Aldersgate Street. It forms the southernmost section of the A1 road.

College of canons and collegiate church
To the east of the road in medieval times stood a college of secular canons of ancient origin, with a collegiate church dedicated to St Martin of Tours. The institution was situated in the City of London parish of St Leonard, Foster Lane.

According to a somewhat dubious tradition, the college and church dated to the 7th or 8th century and was founded by King Wihtred of Kent. It was, more certainly, rebuilt or founded about 1056 by two brothers, Ingelric and Girard, during the reign of Edward the Confessor. Its foundation was confirmed by a charter of William the Conqueror, dating to 1068.

The church was responsible for the sounding of the curfew bell in the evenings, which announced the closing of the city's gates. It also had certain rights of sanctuary; these persisted until 1697 and, as such, made the locality a notorious haven for malefactors. One who sought sanctuary here was Miles Forrest, one of the reputed murderers of the Princes in the Tower.

The college was taken over by Westminster Abbey in 1503 as part of the endowment granted for the upkeep of the Henry VII Chapel. This was an arrangement allowing the abbey to appropriate the college's revenues, and did not make the latter a monastery.

Liberty
As the property of a monastery, the college was dissolved by King Henry VIII and demolished for redevelopment in 1548.

However, the link with Westminster Abbey meant that the precinct was subsequently regarded as part of the borough of Westminster, and as a liberty: a district outside the jurisdiction of the legal officers of the City of London. The inhabitants voted in the Westminster borough elections up to the Reform Act 1832, and the liberty was regarded as an exclave of Middlesex.

This was despite an Act of Parliament of 1815 annexing the liberty to the Aldersgate Ward of the City of London when the site was earmarked for a new General Post Office.

General Post Office
The General Post Office  established its headquarters on the site of the monastic precinct in 1829, after the 1815 Act authorised the project. From here mail coaches departed for destinations across the country. Coaches bound for the north went up St Martin's Le Grand through Aldersgate – the first section of the Great North Road (now the A1 route) to York and Edinburgh. It replaced the previous starting point at Hicks Hall in Smithfield Market. The Post Office building,  a Neoclassical design by Robert Smirke,  was demolished in 1911 and replaced by new premises immediately to the west, on the former site of Christ's Hospital school.

French Protestant chapel

A French Protestant chapel stood on the west side on the corner with Bull and Mouth Street from 1842 until 1888, when it was demolished to make way for new and expanded post office buildings.

Wireless development 
Guglielmo Marconi and his assistant George Kemp successfully demonstrated the wireless telegraphy system between two Post Office buildings on 27 July 1896. A transmitter was placed on the roof of the Central Telegraph Office on Newgate Street and a receiver on the roof of the General Post Office South on Carter Lane. The distance between the two buildings was 300metres (yards). Later that year the Post Office provided funding for Marconi to conduct further experiments on Salisbury Plain. There is a plaque at the transmitter site (now the BT Centre), but no such marker on the building at the receiver site in Carter Lane.

Transport links
The nearest London Underground station is St Paul's, at the southern end of the street.

References

External links

General Post Office

Streets in the City of London
History of the City of London